Danny Cowling (born ) is an English rugby league footballer who plays for the Batley Bulldogs in the Betfred Championship.

He also played for Halifax, Wakefield Trinity in the Super League, and was dual-registered with Doncaster.

He was previously signed with Doncaster.

References

External links

1991 births
Living people
Batley Bulldogs players
Doncaster R.L.F.C. players
English rugby league players
Halifax R.L.F.C. players
Hunslet R.L.F.C. players
Rugby league centres
Rugby league players from Pontefract
Wakefield Trinity players